Mads Christensen (born 2 April 1987 in Herning) is a Danish-German professional ice hockey forward who currently plays for Herning Blue Fox of the Metal Ligaen (DEN).

Playing career
A product of Herning IK, he won the Danish championship with the Blue Fox in 2003, 2005, 2007 and 2008. In 2009, he captured the title with SønderjyskE.

After spending the 2009-10 season with the Iserlohn Roosters of the German DEL, he signed with fellow DEL side Eisbären Berlin in 2010. During his four-year tenure in the German capital, he won three straight championships titles (2011, 2012 and 2013) and the 2011 European Trophy. In 2014, he headed to EHC München and helped the team capture the 2016 and 2017 German championships.

Christensen gained German citizenship in September 2017.

Career statistics

Regular season and playoffs

International

References

External links
 

1987 births
Danish ice hockey forwards
EHC München players
Eisbären Berlin players
Herning Blue Fox players
Iserlohn Roosters players
Living people
People from Herning Municipality
SønderjyskE Ishockey players
Sportspeople from the Central Denmark Region